This page provides the summaries of the AFC third round matches for 2014 FIFA World Cup qualification.

Format
In this round the fifteen winners from the second round joined the five AFC sides seeded 1–5 in the AFC World Cup rankings (Japan, South Korea, Australia, North Korea, Bahrain). The teams were drawn into five groups of four teams, at the World Cup Preliminary Draw at the Marina da Glória in Rio de Janeiro, Brazil on 30 July 2011.

The matches were played from 2 September 2011 to 29 February 2012. The top two teams in each group advanced to the fourth round.

Seeding
The 20 teams were divided into four pots for the draw, each containing five teams. The July 2011 FIFA Ranking – released on 27 July – was used to seed the teams.

Note: Syria was replaced by Tajikistan in the Third Round on 19 August 2011 following the awarding of both Second Round matches to Tajikistan.

Groups

Group A

Group B

Group C

Group D

Group E

Goalscorers
There were 173 goals scored in 60 games, for an average of 2.88 goals per game.

6 goals

 Younis Mahmoud
 Park Chu-Young

5 goals

 Shinji Okazaki

4 goals 

 Joshua Kennedy
 Ismail Abdul-Latif
 Sayed Saeed
 Khalfan Ibrahim

3 goals

 Alex Brosque
 Hao Junmin
 Mojtaba Jabbari
 Javad Nekounam
 Nashat Akram
 Hassan Maatouk
 Ismail Matar

2 goals

 Brett Holman
 Mohammed Tayeb Al Alawi
 Mahmood Abdulrahman
 Yu Hai
 Zheng Zheng
 Cristian Gonzáles
 Hadi Aghily
 Ashkan Dejagah
 Gholamreza Rezaei
 Andranik Teymourian
 Mike Havenaar
 Shinji Kagawa
 Hassan Abdel-Fattah
 Abdallah Deeb
 Amer Deeb
 Ahmad Hayel
 Yousef Nasser
 Mahmoud El Ali
 Pak Nam-Chol
 Mohammed Razak
 Nasser Al-Shamrani
 Ji Dong-Won
 Lee Keun-Ho
 Teerasil Dangda
 Bashir Saeed
 Alexander Geynrikh

1 goal

 Brett Emerton
 Mile Jedinak
 Harry Kewell
 Luke Wilkshire
 Mahmood Al-Ajmi
 Li Weifeng
 Yu Dabao
 Zheng Zhi
 Bambang Pamungkas
 Karim Ansarifard
 Jalal Hosseini
 Milad Meydavoudi
 Alaa Abdul-Zahra
 Karrar Jassim
 Mustafa Karim
 Hawar Mulla Mohammed
 Qusay Munir
 Yuichi Komano
 Yasuyuki Konno
 Ryoichi Maeda
 Kengo Nakamura
 Maya Yoshida
 Baha' Abdul-Rahman
 Bashar Bani Yaseen
 Basem Fat'hi
 Fahad Al Enezi
 Bader Al-Mutawa
 Hussain Fadhel
 Musaed Neda
 Ali Al Saadi
 Abbas Ali Atwi
 Roda Antar
 Mohammed Ghaddar
 Akram Moghrabi
 Jang Song-Hyok
 Hussain Al-Hadhri
 Amad Al Hosni
 Abdulaziz Al-Muqbali
 Abdulaziz Al Sulaiti
 Mohamed El-Sayed
 Mohammed Kasola
 Sebastián Soria
 Salem Al-Dawsari
 Ahmed Al-Fraidi
 Naif Hazazi
 Mohammed Noor
 Isa Halim
 Aleksandar Đurić
 Kim Jung-Woo
 Koo Ja-Cheol
 Lee Dong-Gook
 Akhtam Khamroqulov
 Sompong Soleb
 Ismail Al Hammadi
 Ali Al-Wehaibi
 Ahmed Khalil
 Mahmoud Khamees
 Odil Ahmedov
 Server Djeparov
 Timur Kapadze
 Aleksandr Shadrin
 Maksim Shatskikh
 Sanzhar Tursunov

1 own goal

 Mahmoud Baquir Younes (playing against Kuwait)
 Rashid Al Farsi (playing against Thailand)
 Walid Abbas (playing against Kuwait)
 Hamdan Al Kamali (playing against South Korea)

Notes

References

External links
Results and schedule (FIFA.com version)
Results and schedule (the-AFC.com version)

3
Qual
Qual
Qual